Kiss Instant Live is a series of 2 CD live albums, each containing a recording of the complete set from a show on the Rock the Nation Tour from 2004. The discs were recorded and distributed through Live Nation. Some shows (where the venues were not owned/promoted by Clear Channel Entertainment) were not recorded. In addition, some technical issues prevented the recording of some other dates. The setlists differ slightly between shows. 

Eric Singer returned to the band replacing Peter Criss and featured in the Catman makeup.

Track listing
While the tracklist does differ by the show and the 2 CD's may be split in different spots, most of the albums feature the following songs:

Personnel
Paul Stanley — vocals, rhythm guitar
Gene Simmons — vocals, bass
Tommy Thayer — lead guitar, vocals
Eric Singer — drums, vocals

2004 live albums
Kiss (band) live albums
Live album series